Habrophylla is a genus of tussock moths in the family Erebidae. The genus was described by Turner in 1921. All the species are found in Australia.

Species
Habrophylla euryzona (Lower, 1902) Queensland
Habrophylla pycnadelpha (Lower, 1903) South Australia
Habrophylla retinopepla (Lower, 1905) Queensland

References

Lymantriinae
Heteroneura genera